Hungarian pengő paper money was part of the physical form of Hungary's historical currency, the Hungarian pengő. Paper money usually meant banknotes, which were issued (either in fact or in name) by the Hungarian National Bank. Later – during and after World War II – other types of paper money appeared, including emergency money, bonds and savings certificates.

Initially, paper money was designed abroad, and printed using simple methods. Later, more advanced techniques were used, creating banknotes which reflected stability. After the war, in parallel with their loss in value, the quality of banknotes decreased. Finally, not even serial numbers were printed on the notes.

Banknotes

First series (1926)

The first series of pengő banknotes were printed in 1926 in the following denominations: 5 P, 10 P, 20 P, 50 P, and 100 P. All these banknotes were designed by Ferenc Helbing. Due to the poor printing technology (offset printing) counterfeits appeared in a short time. The situation was so serious that the banknotes soon had to be replaced with a new series. As a consequence, these belong to the most valued collector rarities among Hungarian banknotes.

Second series (1927–1932)

The first denomination of the second series of pengő banknotes was the 1000 pengő note, designed by Zoltán Egri. In contrast to the 1926 series, this banknote (as well as the other notes of this series) was printed using intaglio printing. The next banknote of the series was the 5 pengő note (dated 1928), then the 10 pengő (1929), 20 and 100 pengő (1930), and the 50 pengő notes (1932). These banknotes were designed by Álmos Jaschik.

Low denomination series (1938)

In 1938, a series of 50 fillér, 1, 2, and 5 pengő notes were designed by Franke Rupert. The aim of the National Bank was to quickly supply the territories over which Hungary gained control under the First and Second Vienna Awards with low denomination money. However, only the 1 and 5 pengő notes were put into circulation, although printer's proofs of the others also exist. Since the 1 pengő notes serial number was badly designed it couldn't handle many notes so a second issue was printed that was marked with a star in the serial number.

War series (1936–1941)

The first banknote of the series is the 10 pengő note, which is dated 1936 but was not put into circulation earlier than 1939 but the 10 pengő was printed from 1936. This banknote was followed by the 5 pengő note (dated 1939), then the 2 pengő (1940) and the 20 pengő notes (1941). A 100 pengő note was also planned, however, it was printed in a slightly different version and only used by the evacuated troops in Austria. The banknotes of the series were designed by Endre Horváth

Veszprém series (1943)

Series of banknotes were printed in Veszprém by the evacuated Szálasi government and circulated in the Nazi-ruled part of Hungary in 1944.

First, the 100 P note of 1930 and the 10 P note of 1936 were reprinted in late 1944. These banknotes were marked with a star in the serial number (1 pengő notes of 1938 with a star in the serial number are not Veszprém issues), and are much less common than those without it. Some of the 100 P banknotes were overstamped with a 1,000 P adhesive stamp – these were later replaced by the 1,000 P note of 1943.

Later in 1944 there was a plan to issue a new series of 10, 100 and 1000 P banknotes – all designed by Endre Horváth. Due to lack of time, only the 1,000 P note was officially put into circulation, 100 P notes were printed but only used by the evacuated troops in Austria, the 10 P note is only known as printer's proof. The 100 and 1,000 P notes were designed using elements of earlier banknotes.

In the last days of the Szálasi government, some of the notes (10 P of 1936, 20 P of 1941, 50 P of 1932, 100 P of 1930 and 1,000 P of 1943) were overstamped with a green arrow-cross stamp – however, most of these overstamped banknotes are considered to be fake (i.e. overstamped later to turn these common banknotes into more expensive 'rarities') : stamp inks are tend to be very fresh on these banknotes and it is not clear what the purpose of such overstamping would have been.

Postwar inflation series (1945–1946)

After the war the new democratic government suffered from serious lack of money, so it ordered the national bank to manufacture banknotes quickly and cheaply. There was little time to design new notes, so the plates of banknotes printed in 1926 were reused (compare the 50, 100, 1,000,000 and 100,000,000 notes with the 50, 100, 20 and 10 pengő notes from the 1926 series, respectively) as well as portraits from other notes (e.g. compare the 500 pengő note with the 500,000 korona note and the 100,000 pengő note with the 2 pengő note from 1940). Beginning with the 1000 pengő note, only denominations of integer powers of ten were used. The uncontrolled issue of banknotes aggravated inflation.

In December 1945, the government tried (and failed) to bring inflation under control by a one-off capital levy. This meant that the 1,000, 10,000 and 100,000 pengő banknotes had to be overstamped with a stamp that could be bought for 3 times the value of the banknote. Unstamped banknotes were worth a quarter of their nominal value after this campaign. Later the 100,000 pengő note was issued again in different colors – this banknote and higher denominations did not fall under the capital levy.

Although there were plans to issue 10 billion (1010) pengő notes (similar in design to the 1946-version 10 Ft note), denominations higher than one billion were renamed milpengő (which stands for million pengő) and the indicated value was reduced by a factor of one million. The next denomination after the one billion pengő note became the 10,000 milpengő, which was equal to ten thousand million pengő, and had a similar design to the 10,000 pengő note. The aim was to ease everyday money handling and accounting as well as to reuse the designs of earlier banknotes with little changes.

After the one billion ("milliárd") milpengő note, a new abbreviation had to be used, since further higher denominations were necessary. This became the b.-pengő, which stands for billion pengő; where billion is on the long scale (i.e. - one million million, or 1012 pengő, rather than the short scale 109, which is "milliárd" in Hungarian). The designs were reused again with changes to the color and the addition of the "B" prefix. The highest printed denomination – the one billion ("milliárd") b.-pengő (i.e. - 1021 pengő) note – was never released into circulation, but is widely recognized as the highest-denomination government-backed note ever printed. (Though not the one with the most zeros—see Banknotes of Zimbabwe#Banknotes of the third dollar (ZWR).)

This naming scheme and reuse of the designs is the reason for the cyclic pattern in the hyperinflation pengő notes. The cycle was 6 digit, meaning that notes with the same number before the denomination (e.g. 10,000 pengő, 10,000 milpengő, 10,000, b.-pengő) had the same design, though printed in a different color.

Soviet Red Army issues

In 1944, during the Soviet occupation of Hungary, the Red Army issued paper money without cover in the areas under its control. These banknotes were of poor quality, and aggravated the inflation of the pengő.

References

Hungarian pengo
Currencies of Hungary